Dalzell can refer to:

Places
 Dalzell, Illinois
 Dalzell, Ohio
 Dalzell, South Carolina
 Dalzell, South Dakota
 Dalzell House, Motherwell, Scotland

People
 John Dalzell (1845–1927), U.S. Representative 
 Jon Dalzell, American-Israeli basketball player
 Rick Dalzell (born 1957), American businessman 
 Stewart Dalzell  (1943–2019), American judge
 Trent Dalzell (born 1989), Australian actor
 Earls of Carnwath, surnamed Dalzell
 Nicol Alexander Dalzell (1817-1878), Scottish botanist

See also
 Dalziel